Avenir Sportif de Soliman is a Tunisian football club based in Soliman, Tunisia.

The club finished in first place of Group A of the 2018–19 Tunisian Ligue Professionnelle 2 season, earning promotion to the 2019–20 Tunisian Ligue Professionnelle 1.

Current squad

References 

Association football clubs established in 1960
Football clubs in Tunisia